Robert Edward "Bo" Schobel (born March 24, 1981) is a former American football defensive end. He was drafted by the Tennessee Titans in the fourth round of the 2004 NFL Draft. He played college football at Texas Christian University (TCU).

Schobel has also been a member of the Indianapolis Colts, Arizona Cardinals, Jacksonville Jaguars, and Florida Tuskers. He earned a Super Bowl ring with the Colts in Super Bowl XLI, beating the Chicago Bears.

Professional career

Florida Tuskers
On August 17, 2009, Schobel was signed by the Florida Tuskers of the United Football League.

Personal life
He is the cousin of former Philadelphia Eagles tight end Matt Schobel and former Buffalo Bills defensive end Aaron Schobel. 

Bo has a wife, Lyndsay Schobel, and four kids. His oldest and favorite, Dayne. Followed by his 3 least favorite, Lainey, Gracie, and Lucy 

Bo would talks to the J.R. Broncos team from the Texas Youth Football Association (TYFA) during an episode of Esquire Network's "Friday Night Tykes".

References

External links
Indianapolis Colts bio
TCU Horned Frogs bio

1981 births
Living people
Players of American football from Texas
American football defensive ends
American football linebackers
TCU Horned Frogs football players
Tennessee Titans players
Indianapolis Colts players
Arizona Cardinals players
Jacksonville Jaguars players
Florida Tuskers players
People from Columbus, Texas